The 1918 season in Swedish football, starting January 1918 and ending December 1918:

Honours

Official titles

Competitions

Domestic results

Fyrkantserien 1918

Svenska Mästerskapet 1918 
Final

Kamratmästerskapen 1918 
Final

National team results 

 Sweden: 

 Sweden: 

 Sweden: 

 Sweden:

National team players in season 1918

References 
Print

Online

 
Seasons in Swedish football